Made in Japan may refer to:

Products made in Japan; see Manufacturing in Japan

Music 
Made in Japan (band), an Australian indie rock band, 2009–2014

Albums 
 Made in Japan (Deep Purple album), 1972
 Made in Japan (Flower Travellin' Band album), 1972
 Made in Japan (Deep Forest album), 1999
 Made in Japan, a 1993 album by Siniestro Total
 Made in Japan (Live at Parco Capello), a 2001 live album by Elio e le Storie Tese
 Made in Japan (Whitesnake album), 2013
 Made in Japan (Ayumi Hamasaki album), 2016

Songs 
"Made in Japan" (Buck Owens song), 1972
"Made in Japan", a song performed by Ysa Ferrer, 2003
Made in Japan (EP), a 2012 EP by Bella Thorne and Zendaya

Other uses 
Made in Japan (biography), the autobiography of Akio Morita, a co-founder and former chairman of Sony Corporation, 1986
"Made in Japan" (Bump in the Night), a 1994 episode of the television show Bump in the Night
Grenzeloze Liefde – Made in Japan, a 1996 documentary film about Dutch women living in Japan
 "Made in Japan" (Shake It Up episode), a 2012 episode of Shake It Up

See also
 Maid in Japan, the 2014 debut mini-album by Japanese band Band-Maid